Åke Hultberg (born 29 November 1949) is a Swedish equestrian. He competed in the individual jumping event at the 1972 Summer Olympics.

References

External links
 

1949 births
Living people
Swedish male equestrians
Olympic equestrians of Sweden
Equestrians at the 1972 Summer Olympics
Sportspeople from Västmanland County